Arctic Air is a Canadian drama television series that began airing on CBC Television on January 10, 2012. The series was canceled on March 17, 2014, due to government budgetary cuts.

Synopsis
Arctic Air is about a Yellowknife-based maverick airline and the unconventional family who runs it. The owners are Mel Ivarson, an old school bush pilot; Krista Ivarson, Mel's daughter; and Bobby Martin, the son of Ivarson's deceased partner. Episodes focus on interpersonal conflicts between the characters as well as dramatic flying missions with their aging fleet of Douglas DC-3s, de Havilland Canada Beavers and other aircraft. Each episode has one or more flying missions.

Cast
 Adam Beach as Bobby Martin
 Pascale Hutton as Krista Ivarson
 Kevin McNulty as Mel Ivarson
 Stephen Lobo as Dev Panwar
 Carmen Moore as Loreen Cassway
 John Reardon as Blake Laviolette
 Emilie Ullerup as Astrid Poulsen
 Timothy Webber as Cece Cooper
 Rebecca Marshall as Lindsay Gallagher
 Tanaya Beatty as Caitlin Janvier
 Niall Matter as Tag Cummins

Episodes

Productions
In some episodes, the production crew used Buffalo Airways' hangar in Yellowknife as backdrop.

DVD releases
Entertainment One released the complete first season on DVD in Canada on November 20, 2012.  Season 2 was released on January 7, 2014.  The third and final season was released on October 14, 2014.

Ratings
According to CBC, the total audience for the first episode was just over 1 million viewers.

Awards and nominations

Canadian Screen Awards

Leo Awards

UBCP/ACTRA Awards

Supporting content

Mini-episodes
CBC Television released 5 mini-episodes online, titled Man of the North as supporting material to the first season of the series. These webisodes were each 2–3 minutes in length.

Online games
In support of the show's second season, an online game was launched on its official website, entitled Arctic Air Adventure.

Season 2 Finale
A series of short clips, available exclusively through the series page on the CBC website, were produced to complement the second-season finale.  This online content was nominated for a Canadian Screen Award, in the Best Cross Platform Project, Fiction, category.

VIP Lounge
For the third series of the show, additional content was provided through the show's page on the CBC website, which included additional scenes, and supporting material such as photographs taken by characters, phone conversations and additional graphics related to each episode.

References

External links

See also
 Ice Pilots NWT, a documentary reality TV show about Buffalo Airways
 Flying Wild Alaska, a documentary reality TV show about a bush airline in Alaska

2012 Canadian television series debuts
2014 Canadian television series endings
Television shows filmed in the Northwest Territories
Television shows set in the Northwest Territories
Television shows set in the Arctic
2010s Canadian drama television series
Aviation television series
Culture of Yellowknife
CBC Television original programming